was a town located in Kishima District, Saga Prefecture, Japan.

On March 1, 2006, Yamauchi, along with the town of Kitagata (also from Kishima District), was merged into the expanded city of Takeo.

Geography
Mountains: Mt. Kurokami, Mt. Jinroku
Rivers: Matsuura River (source)

Adjoining municipalities
Saga Prefecture
Arita
Imari
Takeo
Nagasaki Prefecture
Hasami

History
April 1, 1889 - The modern municipality system was established. The area consisted of two villages: Nakato and Sumiyoshi.
April 1, 1954 - Nakato and Sumiyoshi were merged to create Yamauchi Village.
March 1, 1955 - Part of Takeuchi Town was incorporated into Yamauchi Village.
September 1, 1960 - Yamauchi Village became Yamauchi Town (Yamauchi-machi)

Education
Yamauchi Junior High School
Yamauchi Higashi Elementary School
Yamauchi Nishi Elementary School

Transportation

Rail
JR Kyushu
Sasebo Line
Nagao Station - Mimasaka Station

Road
Expressways:
Nagasaki Expressway
Takeo-Kitagata Interchange
National highways:
Route 35
Prefectural roads:
Saga Prefectural Route 26 (Imari-Yamauchi)
Saga Prefectural Route 28 (Ōchi-Yamauchi)
Saga Prefectural Route 45 (Ureshino-Yamauchi)

Notable places and events
Mt. Kurokami, Fūfu Rock
Kurokami no Roman festival
Sangyō festival
Chūō Park

Sister cities
 Sebastopol, California

Dissolved municipalities of Saga Prefecture